Ewen is a male given name, most common throughout Scotland as well as Canada, due to the immigration of Scottish people. It is an anglicisation of the Scottish Gaelic name, Eòghann. It is possibly a derivative of the Pictish name, Uuen (or 'Wen'), "born of the mountain." Ewen or Ewan is also a Scottish surname, as in Clan MacEwen.

Ewen is also a Breton male given name, an alternative form of Erwan, the patron saint of Brittany. Owen is the predominant Welsh variation of the name. Ouen can be considered the French version of the name.

Euan is a Latin word meaning Bacchus.

Variations

People with this given name
Ewen Alison, New Zealand politician
Ewen Bain, a Scottish cartoonist
Ewen Bremner, a Scottish actor
Ewen Cameron, British banking magnate
Ewen Cameron, Australian politician
Ewen Cameron of Lochiel, a Scottish highland chieftain
Ewen Cameron, Baron Cameron of Dillington, member of the British House of Lords
Ewen Chatfield, a cricketer
Ewen Fergusson, British diplomat
Ewen Gillies (born 1825), serial emigrant from St. Kilda, Scotland
Ewen Henderson, English ceramic artist
Ewen Leslie, an Australian actor
Ewen MacDougall, a Scottish nobleman
Ewen Maclean, 9th Laird of Ardgour, British peer
Ewen McKenzie, an Australian rugby player
Ewen McQueen, a New Zealand Christian leader
Ewen Neil McQueen, Australian educational innovator
Ewen Montagu, a British judge, writer and intelligence officer
Ewen Ratteray, Bishop of Bermuda
Ewen Solon, a New Zealand actor
Ewen Southby-Tailyour, British Royal Marine
Ewen Thompson, a New Zealand cricketer
Ewen Vernal, a Scottish musician
Ewen Whitaker, British astronomer

People with this surname
Colin J. Ewen, linguist
Ettore Ewen, better known as Big E (Langston), an American professional wrestler
Frederic Ewen, an English professor
Jade Ewen, a British singer and Eurovision contestant in 2009
Paterson Ewen, a Canadian painter
Stuart Ewen, an American historian
Todd Ewen, a Canadian ice hockey player
William Ewen, former Governor of Georgia, United States
, Breton story-teller and musician

See also 
Ewen (disambiguation)
Even
Ewan
Euan
Eógan
MacEwen
McEwen

References

Breton masculine given names